Wisk'achani (Aymara wisk'acha a rodent, -ni a suffix to indicate ownership, "the one with the viscacha", Hispanicized spelling Viscachani) is a  mountain in the Andes of Bolivia. It is located in the Oruro Department, Pantaleón Dalence Province, Huanuni Municipality. The mountain lies north-east of Huanuni and south-west of the mountain Juch'uy Yaritani.

See also 
 Inka Pukara

References 

Mountains of Oruro Department